Jesús "Chino" Pérez (born October 1, 1997) is an American soccer player who plays as a midfielder.

Career
Pérez was selected by New York City FC with the 22nd pick in the first round of the 2020 MLS SuperDraft, and was included on the club's preseason roster. He wasn't retained by the club beyond preseason, instead signing for Tacoma Defiance of the USL Championship in mid-February 2020. Pérez signed for League of Ireland Premier Division club Dundalk on the 26th February 2021. He made his debut for the club on the 26th March 2021, replacing Sam Stanton at half-time in a 2–1 defeat to Finn Harps at Oriel Park. On the 5th July 2021, it was announced that Pérez was loaned out to USL League One club Forward Madison until the end of the season, having made just 2 appearances for Dundalk. He made his debut in a friendly match against Mexican club Atlético Morelia on 20 July 2021.

References

External links
Jesús Pérez at University of Illinois at Chicago Athletics

1997 births
Living people
Sportspeople from Waukegan, Illinois
USL Championship players
Soccer players from Illinois
Association football midfielders
Akron Zips men's soccer players
UIC Flames men's soccer players
Chicago FC United players
USL League Two players
New York City FC draft picks
Tacoma Defiance players
American soccer players
Dundalk F.C. players
League of Ireland players
Expatriate association footballers in the Republic of Ireland
American expatriate soccer players
American expatriate sportspeople in Ireland
Forward Madison FC players